André Evrard (1 April 1936 – 29 April 2021) was a Swiss painter and engraver.

Biography
Evrard studied at the École d’art de La Chaux-de-Fonds. In 1959, he moved to Vevey, where he would spend the entirety of his career.

André Evrard died on 29 April 2021 at the age of 85.

Museum collections
Aargauer Kunsthaus
Cabinet des estampes de Bâle
Swiss National Library
Collection of the City of Biel/Bienne
Convento del Bigorio
Conservatory of Music Neuchâtelois
Musée d'art et d'histoire de Fribourg
Collection of the City of Geneva
Museum of Fine Arts Le Locle
University of Neuchâtel
Musée Jenisch
Kunsthaus Zürich

Exhibitions
 (February 1956)

References

Swiss painters

1936 births
2021 deaths
People from La Chaux-de-Fonds